is a passenger railway station located in the city of Akiruno, Tokyo, Japan, operated by East Japan Railway Company (JR East).

Lines 
Musashi-Hikida Station is served by the Itsukaichi Line, and is located 7.2 kilometers from the starting point of the line at Haijima Station.

Station layout 
This station consists of one side platform serving a single bi-directional ground-level track, with a small station building. The station is staffed.

Platform

History
It was renamed to its present name on 1 April 1944. With the privatization of Japanese National Railways (JNR) on 1 April 1987, the station came under the control of JR East.

Passenger statistics
In fiscal 2019, the station was used by an average of 3,235 passengers daily (boarding passengers only).

The passenger figures for previous years are as shown below.

Surrounding area
 Akiru Medical Center

See also
 List of railway stations in Japan

References

External links 

JR East Station Information 

Railway stations in Japan opened in 1930
Railway stations in Tokyo
Akiruno, Tokyo
Itsukaichi Line